Claudio Cisullo (born May 14, 1964) is a Swiss serial entrepreneur and investor with Italian roots. He is founder and Chairman of his family office CC Trust Group AG and is also founder and Executive Chairman of the globally active procurement services provider Chain IQ Group AG. Claudio Cisullo ranks among the 300 wealthiest people in Switzerland.

Education 
Following a technical education, Claudio Cisullo completed various advanced trainings in business and administration at the University of St. Gallen.

Career 
Since 1984, Claudio Cisullo has founded a total of 26 companies in various business fields.

Claudio Cisullo is Chairman and owner of CC Trust Group AG, which he founded in 1997 as a family office and as an investment and management company. The enterprise currently comprises 16 investments worldwide in the sectors of biotech, commodities, leisure, pharmaceuticals, professional services, real estate and technology. Special investment focus at present: real estate in Eastern Europe, including investments and participations in sustainable property developments. In 2014, Cisullo founded Chain IQ Group AG and since then has held the position of Executive Chairman. 

He is the founder and Chairman of "The Circle", an international networking platform (club) for billionaires. Cisullo is considered an excellent global networker.

Mandates 
While directing the investment activities of CC Trust Group, Claudio Cisullo holds multiple mandates as strategy advisor and Board Member of several international organizations. He is a member of the Board of Directors of Ringier AG, one of the biggest European media companies, since 2013 and he is a member of the Foundation Board of the Law and Economics Foundation for the promotion of the degree of "Master in Law and Economics" at the University of St. Gallen. In 2014, Cisullo founded Chain IQ Group and since then has held the position of Executive Chairman. In 2017 he founded ACC Investments SRL and in 2019 ACC One Holding AG, two companies in property development and management, both of which he serves as Chairman. In September 2019 Claudio Cisullo was appointed to the Foundation Board of the Swiss Entrepreneurs Foundation, a non-profit initiative with the aim to support start-ups and entrepreneurship within Switzerland and to promote a Swiss innovation ecosystem. In May 2021 he has been elected as Chairman of the Board of Directors of the Romanian award-winning, premium segment, green property developer One United Properties. Claudio Cisullo has been a shareholder and Member of the Board of Directors of One United Properties since 2020 and has recently become the third largest shareholder of the company. 

Selected previous mandates

  Member of the Board of Directors of the New York Center for Global Enterprise.
  Member of the Board of Directors of Ringier Axel Springer Schweiz AG
  Member of the Board of Directors of Admeira AG
  Chairman of the Commercial Advisory Board of the Laureus Foundation Switzerland  
  Chairman of the Industrialization Advisory Board of UBS AG
  Member of the Board of the Sauber F1 Team
  Vice Chairman of the Board of Directors of Marquard Media AG
  Member of the Board of Trigram Global Macro Fund (Hong Kong)
  Member of the Board of Directors of Swisscom IT Services, a subsidiary of Swisscom
  Chairman of the Advisory Board of the International Alpine Symposium (Interlaken, Switzerland)
  Member of the Advisory Board of Swiss Post (Bern, Switzerland) 
  Momber of the Board TM Transport & Management Holding Ltd.
  Member of the European Advisory Board of Hewlett Packard Europe 
  Member of the Board of Corporate Express Holding USA (Denver) and Corporate Express Europe Holding Ltd. (Regensdorf, Switzerland)

Private life 
Claudio Cisullo was born in Switzerland in 1964 as the son of Italian immigrants. He is the father of three daughters.

Publications 
 Managing By Traction (MbT) Reinventing Management in the Cyber-Age The European Business Review, November 2020
 The Cyber-Organisation and the New World of Work: Advocating a twin governance and collaborative intelligence solution to overcome a constant disruptive business context The European Business Review, March 2020
 Beyond Collaborative Intelligence we can see a Meta-Mind Society Surfacing and we can Dream of a Ω-Mind? The European Business Review, September 2019
 Innovation (not) at the core The European Business Review, July 2019
 Rethinking Future Higher Education The European Business Review, January 2019
 Insights into the Transformation of Business in the Cyber-Age The European Business Review, March 2018
 GLOOM vs. BLOOM OF THE FUTURE OF WORK: Can We Chart A Positive Roadmap? The European Business Review, August 2017
 Beyond: Business and Society in Transformation Palgrave Macmillan, 2008

References

External links
 300 Reichsten 2022 Bilanz.ch, November 2022
 Portrait Claudio Cisullo | Chain IQ Group AG
 Portrait Claudio Cisullo | The Center for Global Enterprise
 Portrait Claudio Cisullo | Ringier AG
 Die Reichsten 2017 Bilanz.ch, Dezember 2017
 Claudio Cisullo: "Für eine gute Sache bekommen Sie immer Geld" Finews.ch, Mai 2016
 Der Netzwerker Schweizer Illustrierte, April 2012
 Freunde des Hauses Weltwoche.ch, Ausgabe 33, 2015
 Der Selfmade-Millionär, der Swisscom seine 30'000 Drucker verkauft Aargauer Zeitung, Januar 2011
 Der Netzwerker - Vom Migrantenkind zum Multimillionär Blick.ch, Januar 2008
 Portrait: Claudio Cisullo - Der Selfmademan Itreseller.ch, März 2005

1964 births
Swiss businesspeople
UBS people
Swiss investors
Living people